Lucien Seymour (born July 1, 1983) is a Dutch footballer currently playing for RVVH Ridderkerk.

Career

Netherlands
Seymour played extensively at all levels of the Dutch football system, having played for Excelsior Rotterdam, RBC Roosendaal, SVV-SMC, VVV-Venlo, Deltasport and RVVH Ridderkerk.

United States
Seymour moved to the United States in 2011 to play for the Dayton Dutch Lions in the USL Professional Division in 2011.

References

External links
 Dayton Dutch Lions profile

1983 births
Living people
Dutch footballers
Dayton Dutch Lions players
USL Championship players
Association football forwards